The Company You Keep is an album by American banjoist Alison Brown, released in 2009. The other members of the Quartet, especially pianist John Burr contribute to Brown's compositions more than on any of her previous albums, where she composed mostly on her own.

Reception 

In his Allmusic review, music critic Rick Anderson wrote of the album "...her jazziest material sounds effortless and natural, but she also has no compunction whatsoever about bringing bluegrass and Celtic elements into her sound. On The Company You Keep she is playing and writing at the peak of her powers... "Drawing Down the Moon" is a slightly overlong slow number that tends to meander a bit, but it's the closest thing there is to a misstep on this excellent album."

Steve Morgan of The Louisville Music News writes, "First off, this is not a bluegrass CD. Even though there is a banjo on the cover, bluegrass is but a sliver of what is happening on this album. In fact, Brown's longtime ensemble of John Burr (piano), Joe Craven (mandolin, fiddle, & percussion) and husband Garry West (bass), along with several notable guests, have crafted a record which draws just as freely from rock and jazz as it does from bluegrass."

Ian Perry of Banjo Newsletter has this to say in beginning his review, "Alison Brown’s latest release, The Company You Keep, once again showcases both Alison’s writing skills and her formidable chops, clearly maintaining her place amongst the leading voices in progressive jazz-oriented banjo today."

John Metzger reviews the album for The Music Box, giving it 4 out of a possible 5 stars, and comments, "With The Company You Keep, Brown has ushered another freewheeling showcase to fruition, though this time, it comes together so naturally that even those who aren't already in awe of her fleet-fingered abilities will have to pay attention."

C. Michael Bailey gives the album 5 out of a possible 5 stars and begins his review for All About Jazz by writing, "The discovery of a previously unknown species is a watershed event in the biological sciences. The discovery (or recognition) of the same in music is an equal watershed. Banjoist Alison Brown's The Company You Keep marks such a musical event."

Larry Stephens reviewed the album for Country Standard Time and writes, "While this is a banjo player's recording, it's clear it is intended as an ensemble that features the banjo, not a banjo-heavy record. The interweaving of instruments keeps each song fresh with new interludes always around the corner."

Track listing

Personnel

 Alison Brown – banjo, guitar
 John Burr – piano
 Garry West – bass
 Larry Atamanuik – drums
 Joe Craven – violin, mandolin, percussion
 John Doyle – guitar, lute
 Stuart Duncan – violin
 Joe Craven – fiddle, mandolin, percussion

Charts

References

External links
Alison Brown Official Site
Compass Records Official Site

2009 albums
Alison Brown albums
Compass Records albums